Soo Line 2718 is a H-23 class 4-6-2 Pacific steam locomotive that was originally owned by the Minneapolis, St. Paul and Sault Ste. Marie Railway (the "Soo Line"), but operated by their subsidiary, the Wisconsin Central Railway.

History 
2718 was built in May, 1923 in Schenectady, New York.  It was one of six H-23 class Pacific steam locomotives built for the Soo Line.  In the Soo Line's naming scheme, 'H' indicated the Pacific wheel arrangement. The H-23 were their last Pacific class built.

2718 was donated to the National Railroad Museum in February 1958.  The museum used it for a few years to move cars around the grounds.  It also saw limited service pulling the museum train.

Other H-23 class locomotives 

There were six H-23 class locomotives built in May 1923. One of them is on display.
2719 - Preserved at Lake Superior Museum in Duluth, Minnesota
2720 - Scrapped at United States Steel, July 19, 1951 
2721 - Scrapped at Purdy Company, November 13, 1950 
2722 - Scrapped at American Iron & Supply, December 28, 1954 
2723 - Scrapped at Purdy Company, November 13, 1950

Footnotes

References

External links
 National Railroad Museum Where the 2718 is on display.

2718
ALCO locomotives
4-6-2 locomotives
Individual locomotives of the United States
Railway locomotives introduced in 1923
Standard gauge locomotives of the United States

Preserved steam locomotives of Wisconsin